"2-Way" is the first single from Lil' Romeo's second studio album Game Time. The track features additional vocals from his dad Master P and Silkk The Shocker. It is an almost-complete cover of "It Takes Two" by Rob Base and DJ E-Z Rock, with slight lyrical alterations to the original (i.e. references in Base's own lyrics to himself) and additional samples. The song was played at the ending credits of Hey Arnold!: The Movie. It also appeared in the movie Kangaroo Jack.

Music video
A music video for the track was filmed in April 2002. Two versions of the video were made. The first is when Romeo is performing the song in a basketball stadium & a basketball outfit. The music video also involves the North Miami Beach High School Marching Chargers. The second version includes a basketball game and scenes from Hey Arnold!: The Movie.

Charts

References

Master P songs
Romeo Miller songs
Silkk the Shocker songs
2002 singles